Bunya Mountains is a locality split between the Western Downs Region and the South Burnett Region, Queensland, Australia. The town of Mount Mowbullan is located on the boundary of Bunya Mountains and the enclosed locality of Mowbullan. In the  Bunya Mountains had a population of 144 people.

Geography 
The locality is split between the two local government areas with the smaller north-eastern part of the locality in South Burnett Region and the larger south-western part in the Western Downs Region. The north-eastern part is almost entirely within the Bunya Mountains National Park with a small portion of the south-western part also in the National Park. In contrast most of the south-western part is freehold land used for agriculture but only a very small portion of the north-eastern part as freehold land, used for residential and agricultural purposes. The Bunya Mountain Road roughly follows the split between the two local government areas 

The Bunya Highway passes through the western corner of the locality.

The locality of Mowbullan (in the Western Downs Region) is completely enclosed by the locality of Bunya Mountains and does not form part of the national park. This enclosure within another locality is unusual in Queensland and contrary to the Queensland Government's normal policies.

History 
The locality name comes from the mountain range, Bunya Mountains, and is a Kabi language word bonyi or bunyi, indicating the Bunya pine tree (Araucaria bidwillii).

Bunya Mountains Provisional School opened on 6 October 1919 and closed on 15 December 1922.

From 1923 to 1928 a 670-metre tramway for 250 metre descent from mountain top to bottom at Wengenville, used with winches, winders and flying foxes. The logs were transferred to a horse-drawn tram for movement to a log dump.  A “not to scale” model can be seen at the natural history museum at the Dandabah camping area.

In the  Bunya Mountains had a population of 144 people.

See also
 List of tramways in Queensland

References 

Western Downs Region
South Burnett Region